The Revolution of the Park (Revolución del Parque), also known as the Revolution of '90, was an uprising against the national government of Argentina that took place on July 26, 1890, and started with the takeover of the Buenos Aires Artillery Park. It was led by members of the Civic Union (which would later give rise to the modern Radical Civic Union) against the presidency of Miguel Juárez Celman (of the National Autonomist Party). Though it failed in its main goals, the revolution forced Celman's resignation (who would be replaced by his vice president Carlos Pellegrini) and marked the decline of the elite of the Generation of '80.

Buildup
Near the end of 1889, general discontent (mainly due to high inflation) encouraged the Civic Union (led by Aristóbulo del Valle and Leandro Alem) to attempt to oust President Miguel Juárez Celman, whose conservative rule, like those of previous presidents, had been marked by electoral fraud and corruption.

Uprising and repression
The uprising was led by a civil revolutionary junta and by General Manuel J. Campos. It counted on the indirect support of General and former President Julio Argentino Roca and on the lack of opposition by General Bartolomé Mitre.

The uprising started on 26 July 1890 at the Buenos Aires Artillery Park. It met with swift repression on the part of the government forces, led by generals Carlos Pellegrini (the Vice-President), Roque Sáenz Peña, and Nicolás Levalle. Lacking initiative and ammunition, the revolutionaries were defeated in a matter of days, but the image of the government had suffered. Senator Pizarro demanded the resignation of the entire Executive Branch and the Senate, presided by General Roca, but President Juárez Celman was the only one to accept. Vice-President Pellegrini took office in his stead, to complete the remaining two years of his presidential term.

Goals and results
The Revolution of the Park was intended as a means to "avoid the ruin of the country" by bringing down "a government that represents illegality and corruption", according to its Manifesto. The revolutionary junta rejected "living without voice or vote..., witness the disappearance of rules, principles, guarantees..., tolerate the usurpation of our political rights..., and keeping those in power who have wrought the disgrace of the republic", and denounced that "there is no republic, no federal system, no representative government, no administration, no morality. Political life has turned into a for-profit industry."

The success of the revolution was limited to the resignation of Juárez Celman, who had been notorious for his corruption and abuse of power. The key elements outlined in its Manifesto, however, continued to be present in Argentine politics, as shown by the series of uprisings: Revolution of 1893 and Revolution of 1905.

See also
Radical Civic Union
Panic of 1890

References

Conflicts in 1890
History of Argentina (1880–1916)
Attempted coups in Argentina
Revolutions in Argentina
1890 in Argentina
July 1890 events
1890s coups d'état and coup attempts